Francesco Antonio Caneti (1652–1721) was an Italian miniature painter of the Baroque period. He was born at Cremona, where he was a pupil of Giovanni Battista Natali. He afterwards became a Capuchin friar.

References

1652 births
1721 deaths
17th-century Italian painters
Italian male painters
18th-century Italian painters
Italian Baroque painters
Painters from Cremona
18th-century Italian male artists